Papa Eftim I, born Pavlos Karahisarithis (1883 – 14 March 1968), was a Karamanlı Turkish bishop, who was the first Turkish Orthodox Patriarch of the Autocephalous Turkish Orthodox Patriarchate, an unrecognised Orthodox Christian denomination, that he founded. Eftim I had strong influences from Turkish nationalist ideology. He ruled as Patriarch from 1923 until 1962, when he resigned due to ill health. Keeping the title of honorary patriarch, he ordained his younger son as patriarch assuming the name Papa Eftim II.

Earlier years
Karahisarithis was born in Maden qadaa (today Akdağmadeni) of Bozok sanjak in 1883. He worked in a factory. He was ordained as a priest in 1915 and was given the name Eftim. In the house of his neighbor Çerkes Ethem, he met Mustafa Kemal and became a supporter of his ideas. He took part on 23 April 1920 in the opening of the Turkish Parliament as representative of the Turkish Orthodox Community of All Anatolia (Umum Anadolu Türk Ortodoksları Cemaatleri).

In 1922 the Autocephalous Orthodox Patriarchate of Anatolia was founded in Kayseri by Father Pavlos Karahisarithis a supporter of the General Congregation of the Anatolian Turkish Orthodox, in opposition to Patriarch Meletius IV. During the meeting in a convent in Kayseri, the decision was made to establish a Turkish Christian church independent of the Ecumenical Patriarch of Constantinople.

Papa Eftim clarified his identity as: ''I am not Turks' friend Eftim, I am a Turk who is the son of a Turk Eftim. I have always clarified my Turkish identity. Foreigners can be friends to Turks'. However, a Turkish citizen like me being shown as a foreigner, questioning my people, hurts me deeply. I will never forgive people who do not call me a Turk but friend of Turks.''

Karahisarithis moved to Istanbul in 1923, and took the name Pope Eftim I. The same year, his supporters, with his tacit support assaulted Patriarch Meletius IV on 1 June 1923. On 2 October 1923 Papa Eftim besieged the Holy Synod and appointed his own Synod. When Eftim invaded the Greek Orthodox Patriarchate he proclaimed himself "the general representative of all the Orthodox communities".

With a new Ecumenical Patriarch Gregory VII elected on 6 December 1923 after the abdication of Meletius IV, there was another occupation by Papa Eftim I and his followers, when he besieged the Patriarchate for the second time. This time around, they were evicted by the Turkish police.

Establishment of the Turkish Orthodox Patriarchate
In 1924, Karahisarithis started to conduct the liturgy in Turkish, and quickly won support from the new Turkish Republic formed after the fall of the Ottoman Empire. He claimed that the Ecumenical Patriarchate of Constantinople was ethnically-centered and favored the Greek population. Being excommunicated for claiming to be a bishop while still having a wife (married bishops are not allowed in Orthodoxy) Karahisarithis, who later changed his name to Zeki Erenerol, called a Turkish ecclesial congress, which elected him Patriarch in 1924.

On 6 June 1924, in a conference in the Church of the Virgin Mary (Meryem Ana) in Galata, it was decided to transfer the headquarters of the Turkish Orthodox Patriarchate from Kayseri to Istanbul. In the same session it was also decided that the Church of Virgin Mary would become the Center of the new Patriarchate of the Turkish Orthodox Church.

Karahisarithis and his family members were exempted from the population exchange as per a decision of the Turkish government, although there was not the exemption for either Karahisarithis' followers or the wider Karamanlides communities of Turkish speaking Christian that was hoped for. Most of the ethnic Turkish speaking Orthodox population remained affiliated with the Greek Ecumenical Patriarchate of Constantinople.

The excommunication of Papa Eftim was revoked and he is consecrated as a bishop by metropolitan bishops Amorsios of Kayseri, Kirilios of Erdek and Agatangelos of Adalar on 18 March 1926.

After the death of Mustafa Kemal, Papa Eftim lost some of his prestige in the eyes of the Turkish state. In 1953 he organized a demonstration march against the Greek Orthodox Ecumenical Patriarch Athenagoras I and he continued to make statements against the Greek Patriarchate.

Resignation and death
He resigned in 1962 due to ill health and his elder son Turgut Erenerol (formerly Yiorghos Karahisarithis) became Papa Eftim II, and held this post until his death in 1991. The office was then passed to his younger son Selçuk Erenerol, who took the title Papa Eftim III until 2002. The current holder of the title is Paşa Ümit Erenerol, Papa Eftim I's grandson (son of Selçuk Erenerol, Papa Eftim III) who has held the title Papa Eftim IV since 2002.

He died on 14 March 1968 and was refused a burial in the Greek Orthodox cemetery of Şişli due to his excommunication, and the Turkish government had to intervene to secure his burial.

References

1884 births
1968 deaths
People from Akdağmadeni
Eastern Orthodox Christians from Turkey
Turkish nationalists
Christian clergy in Turkey
Autocephalous Turkish Orthodox Patriarchate